Hedwig Friederike Karoline Auguste Kettler (19 September 1851 – 5 January 1937) was a German women's rights activist, writer and education reformer. She campaigned for equal educational opportunities for boys and girls, and led the effort to establish the first girls' high school in Germany.

Biography
Hedwig Reder was born in Harburg (now part of Hamburg), in 1851, and grew up in Osnabrück. Her parents were Gustav Reder, a railway officer, and Hedwig Elisabeth Brüning. She married Julius Kettler, her cousin, in 1880; they had two children together. The Kettler family lived in Weimar and relocated to Hanover in 1893, when Julius was hired to direct the city's statistical office.

Kettler advocated for the treatment of men and women as intellectual equals and for the right of girls to the same educational opportunities offered to boys. In 1881, she founded the magazine  (Female profession: monthly for the interests of women's issues), to which she was the sole contributor, and in 1887, she began publishing  (Library of women's issues). She assisted in founding the second German girls' high school in Hanover in 1899.

She wrote under the pseudonyms Johanna Kettler and Gotthard Kurland. She retired in Berlin, where she died in 1937.

References

1851 births
1937 deaths
German women's rights activists
German women writers
German educational theorists
People from Osnabrück